Mount Hawley Auxiliary Airport  is a public use airport located seven nautical miles (13 km) north of the central business district of Peoria, a city in Peoria County, Illinois, United States. It is owned by the Greater Peoria Airport Authority. According to the FAA's National Plan of Integrated Airport Systems for 2009–2013, it is categorized as a general aviation facility.

Facilities and aircraft 
It has one runway designated 18/36 with an asphalt surface measuring 4,000 by 60 feet (1,219 x 18 m).

The airport is served by an FBO. Besides fuel, the FBO offers catering, a lounge, refreshments, supplies, a weather briefing station, and a courtesy car.

For the 12-month period ending April 30, 2020, the airport had 21,000 aircraft operations, an average of 57 per day: 99% general aviation and 1% air taxi. At that time, there were 51 aircraft based at this airport: 45 single-engine and 6 multi-engine airplanes.

References

External links 
 Peoria Aviation, the fixed-base operator (FBO)
 Aerial image as of 12 April 1998 from USGS The National Map
 

Airports in Illinois
Buildings and structures in Peoria, Illinois
Transportation buildings and structures in Peoria County, Illinois